Tane Aleksanteri ”Aleksi” Mäkelä (born 20 November 1969) is a Finnish film director and occasional actor. He is best known for having directed several popular films such as Häjyt (1999), Matti (2006) and Vares – yksityisetsivä (2004). During his career, he has also worked for television.

Personal life

Aleksi Mäkelä's father was an actor Vesa Mäkelä (1947–2003).

Selected filmography

The Romanov Stones (Romanovin kivet, 1993)
Sunset Riders (Esa ja Vesa – auringonlaskun ratsastajat, 1994)
The Tough Ones (Häjyt, 1999)
The South (Lomalla, 2000)
Bad Boys (Pahat pojat, 2003)
Vares: Private Eye (Vares – yksityisetsivä, 2004)
Matti: Hell Is for Heroes (Matti, 2006)
V2: Dead Angel (V2 – Jäätynyt enkeli, 2007)
Hellsinki (Rööperi, 2009)
Life for Sale (Kotirauha, 2011)
The Hijack That Went South (Kaappari, 2013)
Kummeli V (2014)
Love Records: Gimme Some Love (Love Records – Anna mulle Lovee, 2016)
95 (2017)

References

External links

1969 births
Living people
Male actors from Helsinki
Finnish film directors
Finnish male film actors